The Juno Award for Vocal Jazz Album of the Year has been awarded since 2000, as recognition each year for the best vocal jazz album in Canada.

Winners

Best Vocal Jazz Album (2000 – 2002)

Vocal Jazz Album of the Year (2003 – present)

References

Vocal Jazz
 Juno Award
Jazz awards
Album awards